Francis Derwent Wood  (15 October 1871– 19 February 1926) was a British sculptor.

Biography

Early life
Wood was born at Keswick in Cumbria and studied in Germany and returned to London in 1887 to work under Édouard Lantéri and Sir Thomas Brock; he taught at the Glasgow School of Art from 1897 through to 1905. He produced a good deal of architectural sculpture typical of the time, including four large roof figures for the Kelvingrove Art Gallery and Museum in Glasgow, the British Linen Bank also in Glasgow, and the Britannic House in London for architect Sir Edwin Lutyens. Freestanding sculptures by him may also be seen in various galleries, such as his 1907 Atalanta (Manchester Art Gallery, with a bronze cast of it now in Chelsea Embankment Gardens),

World War One

As he was too old (at 41) to enlist in the Army at the onset of World War I, Wood volunteered in the hospital wards and his exposure to the gruesome injuries inflicted by the new war's weapons eventually led him to open a special clinic: the Masks for Facial Disfigurement Department, located in the Third London General Hospital, Wandsworth. Instead of the rubber masks used conventionally, Wood constructed masks of thin metal, sculpted to match the portraits of the men in their pre-war normality. Just as had been happening with soldiers operated upon with the recent advances in plastic surgery, Wood's masks provided each with a renewed self-confidence, even self-respect, though they often proved uncomfortable. Face wounds were known to be the most devastating. By hiding the wounds behind the mask, the young men were able to return to relationships with their families and friends.

Each mask required many weeks of work on the part of Woods, and other surgeons who followed his lead. A plaster cast was taken of the subject's wounded face – but only after the wounds and subsequent surgeries had totally healed. The crude process was itself a trial. The plaster cast was used to make a squeeze of plastocene or clay. This disfigured bust was used as the foundation of all prosthetic restorative work, with the sculptor working to replace the missing components of the face with the shapes from the opposing side. The mask itself was made from a thin copper sheet – galvanized copper to facilitate painting after forming. Painting a realistic portrait onto the copper mask was as challenging as the sculpting: each was finished while the patient wore it, in order to most accurately match the tone of the flesh with the enamels.

The ward stayed open only two years, from 1917 to 1919. There is no record of the exact number of masks made, but it must have been several hundred: a tiny drop among the more than 20,000 wounded in the face. His earnest efforts may not have helped statistically, but they influenced the lives of those he helped dramatically.

Post-war
Wood was professor of sculpture at the Royal College of Art from 1918 through to 1923, with William Rothenstein as Principal.

He produced a representation of The Crucified Soldier called Canada's Golgotha in 1919, which caused a diplomatic flap between the Canadian and German governments. His Machine Gun Corps Memorial at Hyde Park Corner was also controversial.

He was elected to the Royal Academy in 1920.

Personal life
Wood married Florence Mary Schmidt (1873–1969) in early 1903. Wood died in London in 1926 at the age of fifty-five. His grave can be found at St Michael's Church, Amberley, West Sussex, with that of his wife.

Selected public works

Other works
 The Penitent Thief, 1918, bronze head of one of the two thieves crucified alongside Jesus Christ, held at Lady Lever Art Gallery, PortSunlight
 Psyche, 1920, bronze, Regarded as a good example of the "New Sculpture" movement, located at the Lady Lever Art Gallery.
 Derwent Wood modelled, 1897–1900, the figures of the Ship's Prow and Zephyrs which adorned the British Linen Company Bank building in Govan Road, Glasgow.
 Statue of Queen Victoria, bronze, 1903, now in the museum at Sheesh Mahal in Patiala
 1912 bronze statue of Edward VII in the uniform of a royal field marshal,  now in the museum at Sheesh Mahal in Patiala
 Statue, in bronze, of Herbert Kitchener, 1st Earl Kitchener, c. 1920, originally erected in Kolkata, then moved to the Kitchener Military College and when that closed erected in the courtyard of the Dhubela Museum in Madhya Pradesh

See also
Anna Coleman Ladd, another sculptor making masks for soldiers disfigured in World War I

References

External links

 
 National Public Radio story, February, 2007
 Project Façade's page on Wood
 Gillies Archives, Queen Mary's Hospital, Sidcup UK
 Suzannah Biernoff, ‘The Rhetoric of Disfigurement in First World War Britain,’ Social History of Medicine (Feb. 2011).

1871 births
1926 deaths
20th-century British sculptors
20th-century English male artists
Academics of the Glasgow School of Art
Artists of the Boston Public Library
British architectural sculptors
British people of World War I
English male sculptors
People from Keswick, Cumbria
Royal Academicians